Alvin is an unincorporated community in the town of Alvin, Forest County, Wisconsin, United States. The community was named after Alvin Spencer, a Baptist minister from Powell County, Kentucky who arrived in the area around 1908.

References

Unincorporated communities in Forest County, Wisconsin
Unincorporated communities in Wisconsin